The 2022 season for  is the 14th season in the team's existence, the fourth as a UCI ProTeam, and the third under the current name. They use Canyon bicycles, Shimano drivetrain, Shimano wheels and Kalas clothing. 

In the 2021 season,  repeated as the best performing UCI ProTeam and, as a result, are guaranteed invitations to all events in the 2022 UCI World Tour.

Team roster 

Riders who joined the team for the 2022 season

Riders who left the team during or after the 2021 season

Season victories

National, Continental, and World Champions

Notes

References

External links 

 

Alpecin–Fenix
2022
Alpecin–Fenix